Clutching Stems is an album by the indie pop band The Ladybug Transistor. It was released on June 7, 2011, by Merge Records.

Reception

Clutching Stems received positive reviews from critics. On Metacritic, the album holds a score of 73/100 based on 9 reviews, indicating "generally favorable reviews."

Track listing
 "Clutching Stems" 
 "Light on the Narrow Gauge"
 "Fallen and Falling"
 "Ignore the Bell"
 "Oh Christina"
 "Caught Don't Walk"
 "Breaking Up on the Beat"
 "Into the Straight"
 "Hey Jack I'm on Fire"
 "Life Less True"

References

2011 albums
The Ladybug Transistor albums
Merge Records albums